The University News may refer:

The University News (Saint Louis University) at Saint Louis University
The University News (University of Missouri–Kansas City), at the University of Missouri–Kansas City
The Independent Florida Alligator (formerly The University News), at the University of Florida
The University News (Moscow), a Russian newspaper that covers information about all universities
University News (FPU), see Fresno Pacific University
 The University News, University of Dallas student-run newspaper